Virgilio Ducci (27 October 1623- year of death unknown) was an Italian painter of the Baroque period, mainly recalled for his work in his native Città di Castello.

Biography
He was born in Città di Castello, but as a youth apprenticed with Francesco Albani in Bologna.

After his training, he returned home. In the chapel of the Angel Guardian of the Duomo in Citta di Castello, he painted two canvases of the story of Tobias and the Angel. He also painted the lunettes over the arch of the chapel of San Francesco di Paola in the church of San Sebastiano. He likely died as a young man.

References

1623 births
17th-century deaths
17th-century Italian painters
Italian male painters
Italian Baroque painters
Painters from Bologna
People from Città di Castello